Bixby is a ghost town in Perkins County, in the U.S. state of South Dakota. The GNIS classifies it as a populated place.

History
A post office was established at Bixby in 1895, and remained in operation until 1951. The community derives its name from the nearby BXB Ranch.

References

Unincorporated communities in Perkins County, South Dakota
Unincorporated communities in South Dakota